The 1980–81 Israel State Cup (Gvia HaMedina) was the 42nd season of Israel's nationwide football cup competition and the 27th after the Israeli Declaration of Independence.

The competition was won by Bnei Yehuda who have beaten Hapoel Tel Aviv 4–3 in penalty shoot-out, after 2–2 in the final.

Format Changes
Starting with this edition, if a match is drawn, a replay is to be played, drawn replays are to be settled with extra time and penalty shootouts. This does not include the final and the semi-final, which are still to be settled without replays.

Results

Fifth Round

Sixth Round

Seventh Round

Round of 16

Quarter-finals

Semi-finals

Final

References
100 Years of Football 1906-2006, Elisha Shohat (Israel), 2006, p. 250
5 upsets in the Football State Cup Davar, 25.1.1981, Historical Jewish Press 
Kiryat Gat - Lod 4:2; Sderot - Beitar Tel Aviv 0:0 Davar, 22.2.1981, Historical Jewish Press 
Upset in the State Cup: Maccabi Be'er Sheva (Liga Bet) eliminated Kiryat Shmona Davar, 4.3.1981, Historical Jewish Press 
Bnei Hatzor from Liga Bet upset Givat Olga Davar, 5.3.1981, Historical Jewish Press 
Cup (Pages 2-5) Hadshot HaSport, 15.3.1981, archive.football.co.il 
Cup (Page 7) Hadshot HaSport, 18.3.1981, archive.football.co.il 

Israel State Cup
State Cup
Israel State Cup seasons